MasterChef Celebrity is a Spanish competitive reality television cooking show based on the British television cooking game show of the same title. It is a special spin-off of the series MasterChef Spain, that premiered on La 1 on 10 April 2013. The show was hosted by Eva González until the 4th season of the series. Jordi Cruz, Samantha Vallejo-Nágera and Pepe Rodríguez repeat as the judges of the show as in the amateur editions. The first season premiered the 6 of November 2016.

A group of public life characters will have to demonstrate, through their week-to-week recipes, they are the "Spain's Celebrity MasterChef". They will have to overcome individual and team skill tests, pressure tests, creative challenges and elimination tests, under the watchful eye and scrutiny of a very demanding jury, composed of the award-winning chefs Pepe Rodríguez Rey, Jordi Cruz and Samantha Vallejo-Nágera.

Show format
Each episode follows the same script, and is divided into three challenges. At the end of every episode, one contestant is evicted.
 First challenge. It happens in the studios. Once they are finished, the judges deliberate and the two to three best dishes determine who will be the captains in the following challenge. It has variable formats and it changes each episode; the most common are:
 Mystery Box Challenge. The contestants receive ingredients with which they have to make a dish according to the specifications of the judges. The contestants have a certain amount of time to complete the task.
 Creative Test. It is a free dish, but the judges dictate some rules or twists the contestants must follow.
 Pressure Test. A celebrity chef visits the set and instructs the contestants on how to make their most famous dish. The contestants have to then recreate it. Sometimes the judges make the dishes contestants have to recreate.
 Team Challenge. Is the second challenge each episode. This challenge takes place outside of the kitchens of MasterChef and usually involves cooking for groups of people. The captains have to choose between the dishes that they are going to prepare and which of the other contestants will be on their team. The losing team then faces off in the elimination round.
 Elimination Test. The winning team observes the losing team from the final challenge in the gallery. The losing team has to cook the recipe chosen by the judges. The format of this challenge is usually in the same style as the used in the First challenge. The judges deliberate and the contestant that has made the worst dish is eliminated from the program.

Series 1 (2016)

Follow-up chart

Series 2 (2017)

Follow-up chart

Series 3 (2018)

Follow-up chart

Series 4 (2019)

Follow-up chart

Series 5 (2020)

Follow-up chart

Series 6 (2021)

Follow-up chart

Series 7 (2022)

Follow-up chart

Ratings
Colour key (nominal):
  – Highest rating during the season
  – Lowest rating during the season

References

Spanish TV series
2013 Spanish television series debuts
Celebrity reality television series
Spanish reality television series
La 1 (Spanish TV channel) original programming
Spanish television series based on British television series